The North American NA-40 was an American prototype bomber aircraft developed by North American Aviation in the late 1930s for evaluation by the United States Army Air Corps. Although unsuccessful, it led directly to the North American B-25 Mitchell medium bomber.

Design and development

Several American aircraft companies responded with submissions: Bell Model 9 with two engines, Boeing-Stearman Model X-100 with Pratt & Whitney R-2180 radials, Douglas Model 7B with Pratt & Whitney R-1830 Twin Wasp radials, Martin Model 167F and North American submitted their NA-40 design. The NA-40 had benefited from the North American XB-21 (NA-39) of 1936, which was the company's partly successful design for an earlier medium bomber that had been initially accepted and ordered, but then cancelled. However, the company's experience from the XB-21 contributed to the design and development of the NA-40. The single NA-40 built flew first at the end of January 1939. It went through several modifications to correct problems. These improvements included fitting  Wright R-2600 "Twin Cyclone" radial engines, in March 1939, which solved the lack of power.

In March 1939, North American delivered the substantially redesigned and improved NA-40 (as NA-40B) to the United States Army Air Corps for evaluation. It was in competition with other manufacturers' designs produced -  the Bell had not been built  - Douglas 7B, Stearman XA-21, and the Martin Model 167F but failed to win orders. The aircraft was originally intended to be an attack bomber for export to the United Kingdom and France, both of which had a pressing requirement for such aircraft in the early stages of World War II. 

Despite the loss of the 7B in an accident injuring a French observer in January, the French had ordered the 7B and a revised version (as the DB-7). Unfortunately, the NA-40B was destroyed in a crash on 11 April 1939 while undergoing testing. Although the crash was not considered due to a fault with the aircraft design, the U.S. Army ordered the DB-7 as the A-20 Havoc.

No YB-25 was available for prototype service tests. In September 1939, the Air Corps ordered the NA-62 into production as the B-25, along with the other new Air Corps medium bomber, the Martin B-26 Marauder "off the drawing board".

Variants

NA-40
A twin-engined, five-seat bomber to meet 1938 USAAF requirement for an attack bomber, it was powered by two  Pratt & Whitney R-1830-56C3G radials. Wingspan was 66 ft (20.12 m), and length 48 ft 3 in (14.71 m). First flown on 29 January 1939, it proved to be underpowered and unstable.
NA-40B
The NA-40B (also known as the NA-40-2) was a modification of the NA-40 prototype with two  Wright R-2600-A71-3 radials and numerous minor changes. It first flew in revised form on 1 March 1939, but crashed on 11 April 1940.
NA-40-3 through NA-40-7
Proposed export versions, not built.

Specifications (NA-40B)

See also

References

Notes

Bibliography

 Borth, Christy. Masters of Mass Production. Indianapolis, Indiana: Bobbs-Merrill Co., 1945.
 Donald, David, ed. The Complete Encyclopedia of World Aircraft. London: Orbis, 1997. .
 Dorr, Robert F. "North American B-25 Variant Briefing". Wings of Fame, Volume 3, 1996. London: Aerospace Publishing. . . pp. 118–141.
 Jones, Lloyd S. U.S. Bombers, B1-B70. Fallbrook, California: Aero Publishers, 1962. .
 Norton, Bill. American Bomber Aircraft Development in World War 2. Hersham, Surrey, UK: Midland Publishing, 2012. .
 Parker, Dana T. Building Victory: Aircraft Manufacturing in the Los Angeles Area in World War II. Cypress, California: Dana Parker Enterprises, 2013. .
 Reuter, Claus. Development of Aircraft Turrets in the AAF, 1917–1944. New York: S.R. Research & Publishing, 2000. .
 Rusinek, Ed. "A Tale of Two Dragons." North American Aviation Retirees Bulletin, Winter 2005.
 Yenne, Bill. The American Aircraft Factory in World War II. St. Paul, Minnesota: Zenith Press, 2006. .

External links

 XB-21 at Aero-Web.org

1930s United States bomber aircraft
NA-40
Aircraft first flown in 1939
Mid-wing aircraft
Twin piston-engined tractor aircraft